Jean-Jacques Caffieri (29 April 1725 - 22 June 1792) was a French sculptor. He was appointed sculpteur du Roi to Louis XV and later afforded lodgings in the Galeries du Louvre. He designed the fine rampe d'escalier which still adorns the Palais Royal. He is better known for his portrait busts, in terracotta or marble: his bust of Madame du Barry is at the Hermitage Museum, St Petersburg. He made a name with his busts of Pierre Corneille and Jean Racine for the foyer of the Comédie Française.

Life
He was born in Paris and came from a family of sculptors from Italy, who had moved to France during cardinal Mazarin's regency. His father Jacques Caffieri and his elder brother Philippe Caffieri were also sculptors. Jean-Jacques remained unmarried and had no children. A pensionary at the Villa Medici in Rome from 1749 to 1753, as well as a student of François Lemoyne, he joined the Académie Royale de Peinture et de Sculpture in France in 1757. He produced bust or portraits of many great men, notably Pierre Corneille, Thomas Corneille, Philippe Quinault, Jean de la Fontaine and Jean-Philippe Rameau, as well as the monument to Richard Montgomery in St. Paul's Chapel in New York City. His students included Jean-Joseph Foucou.

Bibliography
 Auguste Jal, Dictionnaire Critique de Biographie et d'Histoire, Paris, 1867

Works
 Sculptures by Caffieri
 Buste of the comte de Muy (Louis Nicolas Victor de Félix d'Ollières) by Jean-Jacques Caffieri at the  Metropolitan Museum of Art in New York City (1776)
Portrait bust of a young woman, terra cotta (California Palace of the Legion of Honor)

Gallery

Sources

 Extract from Jal's biographical dictionary

External links
 

1725 births
1792 deaths
French people of Italian descent
18th-century French sculptors
French male sculptors
Court sculptors
Artists from Paris
18th-century French male artists